Mansfield is a suburb in the City of Brisbane, Queensland, Australia.

Geography
 
Part of the eastern boundary of the suburb is marked by the Gateway Motorway.

There is a medium-sized industrial estate situated in the northern part of the suburb, in which an Australia Post mail delivery centre is located.

History
The suburb has an agricultural past, consisting mainly of dairy cattle and sheep grazing. Original fencelines can still be found in remaining pockets of bushland. There was also light development of industries related to agriculture, such as wool processing and scouring. Also the quarry once located on Ham and Wecker Roads, excavated large amounts of sandstone used throughout some of the historic landmarks of Brisbane, such as the Brisbane City Hall.

The suburb was named by the Queensland Place Names Board on 1 August 1967, after the Queensland Governor of the time Sir Alan Mansfield.

Brisbane Adventist College Primary Campus opened on 25 January 1966.

Mansfield State School opened on 27 January 1970.

Brisbane Adventist College Secondary Campus opened on 1973.

Mansfield State High School opened on 29 January 1974.

Christian Outreach College opened on 16 May 1978 in West End. It relocated to Mansfield in 1982, but is now within the suburb boundaries of Carindale. It is now known as Citepointe Christian College.

In 1999, the Brisbane Adventist Primary and Secondary Campuses amalgamated to created Brisbane Adventist College.

The median age of the Mansfield population was 38 years of age, 1 year above the Australian median.  69.8% of people living in Mansfield were born in Australia, compared to the national average of 69.8%; the next most common countries of birth were New Zealand 3.8%, England 2.9%, South Africa 1.5%, India 1.4%, China 1.1%.  76.1% of people spoke only English at home; the next most common languages were 2.8% Greek, 2.6% Cantonese, 1.3% Mandarin, 1.2% Arabic, 1% Hindi.

The suburb has a moderate Greek presence with under 2.3% of the population speaking Greek as a first language.

Education

Mansfield State School is a government primary (Prep-6) school for boys and girls at 174 Ham Road. In 2017, the school had an enrolment of 1,032 students with 73 teachers (60 full-time equivalent) and 32 non-teaching staff (21 full-time equivalent). In 2018, the school had an enrolment of 1,125 students with 79 teachers (67 full-time equivalent) and 32 non-teaching staff (22 full-time equivalent). It includes a special education program.

Brisbane Adventist College is a private primary and secondary (Prep-12) school for boys and girls at 303A Broadwater Road. In 2017, the school had an enrolment of 522 students with 46 teachers (40 full-time equivalent) and 19 non-teaching staff (14 full-time equivalent). In 2018, the school had an enrolment of 528 students with 43 teachers (38 full-time equivalent) and 23 non-teaching staff (17 full-time equivalent).

Mansfield State High School is a government secondary (7-12) school for boys and girls at Corner Broadwater & Ham Road. In 2017, the school had an enrolment of 2,448 students with 172 teachers (161 full-time equivalent) and 59 non-teaching staff (43 full-time equivalent). In 2018, the school had an enrolment of 2,599 students with 183 teachers (171 full-time equivalent) and 62 non-teaching staff (48 full-time equivalent). It includes a special education program.

Amenities 
The Mansfield Tavern has served as a venue for many local and touring musical acts. The venue has featured acts as The Offspring, Wickety Wak, Fear Factory, Hunters & Collectors, Madness, Hoodoo Gurus, The Angels and British rock band The Cult.

Mansfield is located in the region of the city which is now colloquially known as the "Bible Belt" due to the large number of people who have settled there to be close to Christian schools and churches.

Arguably the greatest asset of the Mansfield area is its remaining pockets of bushland and parklands. The largest public park in Mansfield, Broadwater Park, is a reasonably large open space with barbecue areas and children's play equipment. Adjoining this parkland is a large bushland reserve which follows the course of Bulimba Creek (a tributary of the Brisbane River).

Transport 
Mansfield has regular bus services to the CBD and to the Westfield Garden City shopping centre at Upper Mount Gravatt.

References

External links

 

Suburbs of the City of Brisbane
Populated places established in 1967
1967 establishments in Australia